The Red Tornado is an album by trumpeter Red Rodney which was recorded at New York City's Bell Sound Studios in 1975 and released on the Muse label.

Reception

The AllMusic review by Scott Yanow stated "Red Rodney's string of Muse recordings in the 1970s found the trumpeter getting stronger album by album. For this date, he plays in the hard bop genre ... most of the tunes are based either on blues or on earlier songs (including "originals" close to "So What" and "Cherokee"). Rodney sounds strong".

Track listing
All compositions by Red Rodney except where noted.
 "For Dizzy" (George Young) - 5:40
 "I Can't Get Started" (Vernon Duke, Ira Gershwin) - 5:15
 "Red Bird" - 8:50
 "The Red Tornado" - 8:12
 "Nos Duis Ga Tarde" (M. Albonese, U. Yoeta) - 5:10
 "The Red Blues" - 6:00

Personnel
Red Rodney – trumpet
Bill Watrous – trombone
 George Young - tenor saxophone, flute
Roland Hanna – piano, electric piano
Sam Jones – bass
Billy Higgins – drums

References

Muse Records albums
Red Rodney albums
1976 albums
Albums produced by Bob Porter (record producer)